St Joseph's is a Gaelic football club in the town of Waltham Cross, Hertfordshire, England.

History 
Founded in April 2005 by Noel Griffin, a native of Carraroe, County Galway (from where the club takes its colours), to introduce youngsters in the area to the sport of Gaelic football. The club was named after the St Joseph's Parish of Waltham Cross and was then accepted into the Hertfordshire Gaelic Athletic Association as a Junior club. 
Since then the club has regularly fielded Under-8, Under-10, Under-12, Under-14 and Under-16 sides in the County Competitions with the club lifting its first Trophy in September 2010 when the Under-16's won the County Cup.
The club fielded a senior side for the first time in July 2011. Griffin won the Broxbourne Coach of the Year for 2013.  In 2014, the U-14 side won both the League and County Championships for the first time.

Honours 

Under-16's - Hertfordshire GAA County Cup (2010)

Under-14's - Hertfordshire GAA County Cup (2014), Hertfordshire GAA League (2014)

Links 
 Club Website
 Club Facebook

Sports clubs established in 2005
Organisations based in Hertfordshire
Sport in Hertfordshire
Gaelic Athletic Association clubs in Britain
Gaelic football clubs in Britain
Waltham Cross